Pseudocatharylla simplex is a moth in the family Crambidae. It was described by Philipp Christoph Zeller in 1877. It is found in China (Tibet, Chekiang, Tschunking) Japan and the Russian Far East (Ussuri, Amur).

References

Crambinae
Moths described in 1877